Asipulo, officially the Municipality of Asipulo  is a 5th class municipality in the province of Ifugao, Philippines. According to the 2020 census, it has a population of 15,963 people.

The town, formerly part of Kiangan, was incorporated as a separate municipality pursuant to Republic Act No. 7173, ratified on January 13, 1992.

Geography

Barangays
Asipulo is politically subdivided into 10 barangays. These barangays are headed by elected officials: Barangay Captain, Barangay Council, whose members are called Barangay Councilors. All are elected every three years.

 Amduntog
 Antipolo
 Camandag
 Cawayan
 Haliap
 Liwon
 Namal
 Nungawa
 Panubtuban
 Pula

Climate

Demographics

Economy

Government
Asipulo, belonging to the lone congressional district of the province of Ifugao, is governed by a mayor designated as its local chief executive and by a municipal council as its legislative body in accordance with the Local Government Code. The mayor, vice mayor, and the councilors are elected directly by the people through an election which is being held every three years.

Elected officials

JCampbell Park

The JCampbell Park or Julia Campbell Agroforest Memorial Eco-Park, is an eco-park located in Barangay Pula in this town. The camp is dedicated in memory of Julia Campbell (journalist), a U.S. Peace Corps volunteer working in the Philippines and was murdered in the area in 2007 on her trek to Batad Rice Terraces.

References

External links
 [ Philippine Standard Geographic Code]
Philippine Census Information
Local Governance Performance Management System

Municipalities of Ifugao